Division I men's lacrosse records listed here are primarily records compiled by the NCAA's Director of Statistics office. 

Included in this consolidation are the NCAA men's Division I individual single-season and career leaders. Official NCAA men's lacrosse records did not begin until the 1971 season and are based on information submitted to the NCAA statistics service by institutions participating in the weekly statistics rankings, which started in 1996.  Career records include players who played at least three seasons (in a four-season career) or two (in a three-season career) in Division I during the era of official NCAA statistics. In statistical rankings, the rounding of percentages and/or averages may indicate ties where none exist. In these cases, the numerical order of the rankings is accurate.

Also included here are college lacrosse records from prior to 1971. Also, prior to 1971 there was not an official “Division I” as that is an NCAA designation. Prior to 1971, the USILA had informal “Large College” and “Small College” designations. Any USILA era records included here are “Large College” records. 

These records are compiled from individual school records and are from players at schools which were considered the highest level lacrosse schools. Compiling and validating lacrosse records prior to the "NCAA-era" is hit-or-miss. In many cases, USILA era records can be gathered from a university's own record books. To date, the NCAA does not officially recognize lacrosse records prior to 1971 as well as several records during the NCAA era, and the USILA does not maintain a database of lacrosse records. 

Certain USILA era lacrosse records, nonetheless, have been included below.  In other cases, career or single-season records are indicated below, where the NCAA has not validated or officially recognized that record, for players during the "NCAA-era", post-1971.

Career leaders

Points

 [a] Granted a fifth season of eligibility
 [b] Zach Greer's career points mark of 353 points is not officially recognized by the NCAA. Greer was granted a fifth season of eligibility and Bryant was considered a reclassifying institution that year. The NCAA lists Greer's career points as 285, though he scored 42 goals with 26 assists for 68 points in 2009, for a total of 353 career points.
 [c] Lehigh records have Cameron with 308 career points, while NCAA record book shows Cameron with 307 career points.

Points per game

  [a] These records are not recognized by the NCAA and were compiled from individual school records.

Goals

 [a] Zach Greer's career goals of 248 are not officially recognized by the NCAA, because Greer was granted a fifth season of eligibility and Bryant was considered a reclassifying institution. Greer scored 42 goals in 2009 for Bryant.
 [b] Mac O’Keefe holds the NCAA record for career goal.
 [c] These records are not recognized by the NCAA and were compiled from individual school records.

Source:

Goals per game

 [a] These records are not recognized by the NCAA and were compiled from individual school records.

Assists

 [a] Lehigh record books show Cameron with 186 career assists while NCAA records have Cameron with 185.
 [b] Granted a fifth season of eligibility
 [c] These records are not recognized by the NCAA and were compiled from individual school records.

Assists per game

 [a] These records are not recognized by the NCAA and were compiled from individual school records.

Single-season leaders

Points

 [a] - These records are not recognized by the NCAA and were compiled from individual school records.

Points per game

 [a] - These records are not recognized by the NCAA and were compiled from individual school records.

Goals

 [a] - These records are not recognized by the NCAA and were compiled from individual school records.

Goals per game

 [a] - These records are not recognized by the NCAA and were compiled from individual school records.

Assists

 [a] - These records are not recognized by the NCAA and were compiled from individual school records.

Assists per game

 [a] - These records are not recognized by the NCAA and were compiled from individual school records.

Most Wins and National Titles by a program

The NCAA does not officially recognize lacrosse records prior to 1971, and the USILA does not maintain a database of lacrosse records. USILA era lacrosse records, nonetheless, have been included below. National titles include all NCAA, USILA, all divisions.

Current NCAA Division I lacrosse programs with 450 or more wins through 2022:

Winningest coaches

See also
NCAA Division I men's lacrosse records
Johns Hopkins Blue Jays Men's lacrosse records
NCAA Division I Men's Lacrosse Championship
United States Intercollegiate Lacrosse Association
Wingate Memorial Trophy

References

External Links
 NCAA Lacrosse Records

NCAA lacrosse
College sports records and statistics in the United States